The 2015–16 season is Hapoel Tel Aviv Football Club's 92nd year in the Israeli Football, their 26th consecutive and 74th season in the Top Division in Israel.

Kit
Supplier: Puma / Sponsor: Fujitsu

References

Hapoel Tel Aviv F.C. seasons
Hapoel Tel Aviv